Ameer Hamza (born 22 September 1995) is a Pakistani cricketer. He was part of Pakistan's squad for the 2014 Under-19 Cricket World Cup. He made his List A debut for Lahore Whites in the 2018–19 Quaid-e-Azam One Day Cup on 6 September 2018.

References

External links
 

1995 births
Living people
Pakistani cricketers
Lahore Whites cricketers
Cricketers from Lahore
Wicket-keepers